is a racing video game developed by Bugbear Entertainment and published by Namco Bandai Games (under the Namco brand) for Microsoft Windows, PlayStation 3 and Xbox 360 in 2012. It is the eighth installment of the Ridge Racer franchise, and the first game in the series to be released on Windows. Unbounded is also the most recent game in the series to be released on home consoles as its successors only focused on handheld devices.

Unbounded marks a departure from the traditional Ridge Racer drifting style, and moved to a more combat-oriented and destructive style, similar to the Burnout series and Split/Second, as well as implementing customizations.

Development
Ridge Racer Unbounded offers a number of changes that depart from traditional Ridge Racer gameplay. Additions to the game include the ability to design and share tracks and a new emphasis on vehicular combat.

While Unbounded was originally scheduled for release in North America and Europe in early March 2012, it was delayed just before the planned release, as Namco Bandai wanted to allow more time "to pack the disc with features that will truly make the game sing". The game was released in March the same year in North America and Europe and later in April in Australia on all platforms. The game was never released in Japan. Despite this, it seems to borrow inspiration from an earlier Namco game, also a vehicular combat video game, released in 2005 only in Japan.

Ridge Racer Driftopia
A free-to-play version called Ridge Racer Driftopia was made. A beta version was released for Windows and PlayStation 3 in August 2013. Driftopia was later cancelled, with the beta servers shut down on 15 August 2014.

Plot
Set in a fictional city called Shatter Bay, racers gather to compete in no-rules, all-out street races. Competing for money and superiority in fast-paced blasts through the streets dodging traffic and tearing through any obstacles that get in their way. A mysterious team led by a Japanese Hashiriya master, called "The Unbounded", appears playing a major role in the racing activity throughout Shatter Bay.

Reception

Ridge Racer Unbounded received "average" reviews on all platforms according to the review aggregation website Metacritic.

411Mania gave the PlayStation 3 version a score of eight out of ten, calling it a welcome addition in the series. The Digital Fix gave the Xbox 360 version a score of eight out of ten, considering the game as reinvention in the franchise.  The Guardian gave the same console version a similar score of four stars out of five, criticising some elements as frustrating. The Daily Telegraph likewise gave the same console version four stars out of five, but considered the game and its handling too similar to Burnout series.

In contrast, Digital Spy gave the same console version three stars out of five, criticising the lack of tutorial material, sometimes problematic cars to control, the rubberband AI and weak destruction elements. Destructoid gave the Xbox 360 version 5.5 out of ten, praising its "surprisingly good map editor", but criticizing the level design and the poor lighting conditions during sunset scenes, also suggesting players to play the 2010 Need for Speed: Hot Pursuit game instead.

References

External links

2012 video games
Bandai Namco games
Multiplayer and single-player video games
Multiplayer online games
PlayStation 3 games
Racing video games
Ridge Racer
Street racing video games
Video games developed in Finland
Windows games
Xbox 360 games
Bugbear Entertainment games